Henry Kelsall  (c. 1692–1762), of Colkirk, Norfolk, was a British administrator and politician who sat in the House of Commons from 1719 to 1734.

Kelsall was the son of Henry Kelsall of Chester. He was educated at Westminster School under Knipe, where he was a school-fellow of  Thomas Holles, the future Duke of Newcastle. He was admitted at Trinity College, Cambridge on 7 February 1708, aged 15 and became a fellow in 1714.
 
Kelsall was appointed Senior clerk at the Treasury under William Lowndes in November 1714. This was presumably through the influence of Newcastle, and he retained the post for the rest of his life.  Newcastle was probably also instrumental in his return as Member of Parliament for Chichester at a by-election on 3 December 1719.  At the 1722 general election, the Government brought him in as MP for Bossiney.  After Lowndes death in 1724, he was second in command at the Treasury to John Scrope.  He served on the House of Commons committees that were responsible for drawing up the finance bills each session. At the 1727 general election, he was returned as MP for Mitchell.   He did not stand in 1734  but was appointed a commissioner of land taxes in 1735. He still retained his Treasury post. On 27 May 1736, he became a Fellow of the Royal Society. In June 1761 he tried  to sell his position as commissioner of taxes  but Newcastle  refused  to allow it.

Kelsall applied to Newcastle for a small pension for his daughter on 1 February 1762, shortly before his death and it was subsequently granted. He died on 10 February 1762.

References

External links
National Trust Collections - Henry Kelsall

1690s births
1762 deaths
People educated at Westminster School, London
Alumni of Trinity College, Cambridge
Members of the Parliament of Great Britain for Bossiney
British MPs 1715–1722
British MPs 1722–1727
British MPs 1727–1734
Fellows of the Royal Society
Members of the Parliament of Great Britain for Mitchell
Members of the Parliament of Great Britain for English constituencies